Palappurathu Kesavan Surendranatha Thilakan (15 July 1935 – 24 September 2012) was an Indian film and stage actor who appeared in over 200 Malayalam films. Thilakan was known for his elaborate method acting, realistic and spontaneous appearances. He is considered by many to be one of the greatest Indian actors of all time.

Early life 
Thilakan was the second of the six children of Palapurath T. S. Keshavan (1904–1972) and Devayani (1912–2010). Thilakan was born in Plankamon, Ayroor Panchayat in the present-day Pathanamthitta district of Kerala. He had his primary education from Asan Pallikoodam, Manikkal and St. Louis Catholic School, Nalamvayal and Sree Narayana College, Kollam. Thilakan lived in Plankamon until he started acting in films for which he moved to Ernakulam.

Thilakan started his full-time career in acting after leaving college in the year 1956.  During this period he and several friends formed a drama troupe called the Mundakayam Nataka Samithy in Mundakayam, where his father was working as an estate supervisor. He worked with the Kerala People's Arts Club till 1966, followed by stints in Kalidasa Kala Kendra, Changanacherry Geetha, and P. J. Antony's troupe. He also performed in several radio plays presented by All India Radio

Career
Thilakan began his career in cinema with a role in the P. J. Antony-directed Malayalam movie Periyar (1973). He then worked in Gandharvakshetram and Ulkadal (1979). His first role as a lead character was as Kallu Varkey, a drunkard in Kolangal (1981). Thilakan was awarded his first Kerala State Film Awards in 1982 for his role in Yavanika.

In 1988, he received the National Film Award for Best Supporting Actor for his performance in Rithubhedam, and again in 1994. In 1998, he won State awards for Santhanagopalam and Gamanam. He was strongly favored to get another National Film Award for Best Actor for his performance in the movie Perumthachan, but the award was given to Amitabh Bachchan over Thilakan amidst suspicions of strong lobbying, as Amitabh had announced his retirement earlier that year. The film Kireedam was a milestone in Thilakan's career; in this film, he portrayed a helpless policeman silently watching the fate of his son, played by Mohanlal, who was corrupted by society's influences. In 1989 he performed in Mrugya, in which his role of a Reverend Father Panangodan was well appreciated by critics and won him many accolades. In the 1990s Thilakan was part of many Mohanlal evergreen hit films. In 1987, he played the comic role of Ananthan Nambiar in the cult-classic comedy movie Nadodikkattu, from which several of Thilakan's lines became very popular. In 1993, he continued his role as the father of Sethu Madhavan (Mohanlal) in the movie Chenkol. Like its prequel Kireedam, this movie also fared well both commercially and critically. His role as a retired mathematics teacher, father of Aadu Thoma (Mohanlal), in the 1995 blockbuster movie Sphadikam was well appreciated by critics and audiences alike. In 1998, he played the role of Dileep's father in the superhit Meenathil Thalikettu, and in his subsequent release he donned the role of a villain in the Kunchako Boban starrer Mayilpeelikavu. In the same year, he was also seen in Chinthavishtayaya Shyamala. Other notable films Thilakan has acted in include Moonnam Pakkam, Namukku Parkkan Munthiri Thoppukal, Mookkilla Rajyathu, Randam Bhavam, Kaattu Kuthira and Yavanika.

He has also acted in other South Indian languages, such as Tamil, Telugu and Kannada.

Thilakan has portrayed a range of characters; however, his most well-known role is that of the father of Mohanlal, portraying a father-son duo. Movies where he donned this role include Kireedam, Sphadikam, Narasimham, Evidam Swargamanu, Pavithram and Chenkol. He has also played father roles to other popular actors, including with Mammootty in Sangham, The Truth, No. 1 Snehatheeram Bangalore North and Pallavur Devanarayanan, with Jayaram in Veendum Chila Veettu Karyangal and Sandesam with Kunchacko Boban in Aniyathi Pravu and with Prithviraj in Sathyam. He has also played a number of antagonists, such as in Randam Bhavam, Karma and Kaalal Pada. He has played comical roles in films like Nadodikkattu and Pattanapravesham (as a coward underworld don), Mookkilla Rajyathu (as a break-out from a mental hospital), Kuttettan (as a pimp) and Naaduvazhikal (as a good-for-nothing, vain person). His is also remembered for the role of comic underworld don Damodarjj in Sanmanassullavarkku Samadhanam. Thilakan played lead roles in Ekantham, Perumthachan, Santhanagopalam, Kaattukuthira, My Dear Muthachan, Mukhamudra (double role), etc.

In 2006, he was seen in the Suresh Gopi-Shaji Kailas blockbuster, Chinthamani Kolacase, where he played the father of the title character Chinthamani enacted by Bhavana. In 2007, he acted in Ekantham, for which he received a special mention from the jury.
In 2009, he was also seen in Pazhassi Raja, and in the same year he played Mohanlal's father one last time in the actor's 300th movie Evidam Swargamanu. In 2011, he played a significant role in the Prithviraj blockbuster Indian Rupee directed by Renjith. In 2012, he played the role of Kareem Bhai in Ustad Hotel and as the grandfather of Faizy, acted by Dulquer Salmaan.

Controversies

National Film Award 
Thilakan, in an interview, claimed that the then jury chairman Ashok Kumar was keen on giving him the 1991 National Film Award for Best Actor for Perumthachan but that a Congress leader wanted the award to be given to Amitabh Bachchan to woo him back to their party.

FEFKA 
In February 2010, it was reported that the producer of the movie Christian Brothers excluded Thilakan from the film at the request of the FEFKA, the predominant film technicians association. Thilakan had been earlier signed for a role in the film. The exclusion was reportedly due to Thilakan acting in a film by director Vinayan, who till recently headed the rival association MACTA. On 3 February 2010, Thilakan publicly protested against the unofficial ban enforced on him by FEFKA and blamed FEFKA for engineering the ban. The Association of Malayalam Movie Artists (AMMA) issued a show cause notice to Thilakan for bringing the issue into the public domain. Thilakan accused AMMA, of which he too is a member. On 20 February 2010 the CPI's trade union wing, AITUC, came out openly in support of Thilakan, while a senior party leader and Rajya Sabha member K. E. Ismail expressed reservations about political involvement in the issue.

Thilakan was originally cast to play a role in a UAE-Indian co-production film Dam 999. He was later replaced following a notice from FEFKA stating that the association would boycott the film if Thilakan were to act. Sohan, the director, was forced to seek a substitute for Thilakan when it "came to the point that shooting might be disrupted." Eventually, Rajit Kapur was cast instead of Thilakan. Some reports contended that Association of Malayalam Movie Artists (AMMA) also had intervened in Thilakan's replacement. In response, Thilakan and his supporters orchestrated a march near the shooting location of the film in Alappuzha.

Personal life

Relationships 
Thilakan's first partner was actress Santha with whom he appeared in several productions. Thilakan and Santha had two children elder son shammi is good actor Shammi Thilakan and Shobi Thilakan. Later, he had a second partner, his co-artist Sarojam with whom he had a son, Shibu Thilakan, and two daughters Dr. Sonia Thilakan and Sophia Ajith.

Views 
Thilakan was a staunch atheist throughout his life, and was a supporter of Communist Party. He was a member of many drama troupes which actively promoted Communism in Kerala. When he died, his dead body was draped with Communist flag.

Death
For a long time, Thilakan dealt with numerous health issues like diabetes, hypertension and heart disease. He was hospitalized multiple times due to these problems. Finally, he was admitted to Jubilee Mission Hospital in Thrissur on 1 August 2012 after he collapsed during the shooting of the film Scene Onnu Nammude Veedu. He was then shifted to KIMS Hospital, Thiruvananthapuram and was in critical condition after suffering two heart attacks. Besides having cardiac problems, Thilakan was suffering from pneumonia. He was put on a ventilator and died on 24 September 2012. He was cremated with full state honours.

Awards

Civilian honours
 2009 – Padma Shri

National Film Awards:
 1987 – Best Supporting Actor – Rithubhedam
 2006 – Special Jury Mention – Eakantham
 2012 – Special Jury Mention – Ustad Hotel

Kerala State Film Awards:
 1981 – Second Best Actor – Yavanika
 1985 – Second Best Actor – Yathra
 1986 – Second Best Actor – Panchagni
 1987 – Second Best Actor – Thaniyavarthanam
 1988 – Second Best Actor – Mukti, Dhwani
 1989 – Special Jury Award – Various films
 1990 – Best Actor – Perunthachan
 1994 – Best Actor – Gamanam, Santhanagopalam
 1999 – Second Best Actor – Kattathoru Penpoovu

Filmfare Awards South
2006- Filmfare Lifetime Achievement Award - South
 2011- Best Supporting Actor Male (Indian Rupee)

Other awards
 2010 – Bharath Gopi Award
 2007 – Kerala Sangeetha Nataka Akademi Fellowship
 2001 – Asianet Film Award for Lifetime Achievement

Filmography

Malayalam films

Tamil films
 Sathriyan (1990) as Arumai Nayagam
 Moondrezhuthil En Moochirukkum (1991) as Namboodiri
 Udan Pirappu (1992)
 Kilipetchu Ketkava (1993)
 Karuppu Vellai (1993)
 Ayudha Poojai (1995) as Samiyappan
 Mettukudi (1996)
 Aravindhan (1997)
 Kallazhagar (1999)
 Bala (2002)
 Nee Venunda Chellam (2006) as Viswanathan
 Suyetchai MLA (2006)
 Alibhabha (2008)
 Uyirin Yedai 21 Ayiri (2011)

Telugu films
Sri Mahalakshmi (2007) as Sri Mahalakshmi's father
Samarasimha Reddy (1999) as Balakrishna's father

Kannada films
 Mother India (1995)

As a dubbing artist
1983 Asthi as the managing director portrayed onscreen by Vijayan Karote
2003 Magic Magic 3D – Voice for S. P. Balasubrahmanyam

Television serials

TV shows

References

External links
 
Thilakan at MSI

Indian male film actors
Male actors from Pathanamthitta
Recipients of the Padma Shri in arts
Kerala State Film Award winners
1935 births
Male actors in Malayalam cinema
Filmfare Awards South winners
Indian male stage actors
2012 deaths
Best Supporting Actor National Film Award winners
Indian atheists
20th-century Indian male actors
21st-century Indian male actors
Indian male voice actors
Male actors in Tamil cinema
Male actors in Telugu cinema
Indian male television actors
Male actors in Malayalam theatre
Special Mention (feature film) National Film Award winners
Recipients of the Kerala Sangeetha Nataka Akademi Fellowship